Mean Girls 2 is a 2011 American teen comedy television film directed by Melanie Mayron, and serves as a sequel to the 2004 film Mean Girls. The film premiered on ABC Family on January 23, 2011, and released direct-to-video on February 1. It stars Meaghan Martin, Jennifer Stone, Maiara Walsh, Nicole Gale Anderson, Claire Holt, Diego Boneta, and Linden Ashby. It was the final film produced by Paramount Famous Productions, as they closed down after its release.

Tim Meadows, the only original cast member to return, reprises his role as Principal Ron Duvall.

Plot

Jo Mitchell, an 18-year-old high school senior from Ohio, attends North Shore High School and hopes to attend Carnegie Mellon, the alma mater of her late mother who died when Jo was a baby. 

On her first day, however, she encounters a clique called "The Plastics", composed of Mandi Weatherly, the self-proclaimed leader; Chastity Meyer, a ditzy girl with a raging libido; and Hope Plotkin, a hypochondriac. Jo also meets Abby Hanover, whom Mandi perceives to be a rival. Despite Jo's attempts to avoid the Plastics, conflict develops between them and Abby.

Jo's father is a mechanic who rebuilds engines for NASCAR. As a result, she becomes quite a good mechanic herself and ends up taking an advanced shop class, where she meets a boy named Tyler and develops a crush on him. Her principal means of transportation is a Vespa motor scooter.

After Jo gives Abby a ride home, she meets her father, a successful infomercial entrepreneur who offers to pay Jo's college tuition in exchange for her good friendship with Abby. Jo reluctantly accepts, motivated by her desire to attend Carnegie Mellon. Jo, Tyler and Abby become close friends, while Jo learns that Tyler is Mandi's stepbrother. Mandi also escalates her prank war, which includes using artificial sweetener and coffee to ruin an engine being rebuilt by Jo's father.

When Jo and Abby discover that Mandi is throwing a birthday party, Jo decides that Abby have one also; Abby's party is "all invited" , unlike Mandi's "invite only" party. After the Plastics see no one at Mandi's but hears Abby's party's music, they have Hope put ipecac onto the pizza that is ordered there. After Jo notices it smells funny, she sees Hope also paying the pizza delivery guy, so she stashes it away. When the Plastics go to that party, they don't see anyone puking. Just as Nick, Mandi's boyfriend, doesn't see any food, Jo gives him the injected pizza to eat; after Mandi kisses him for Jo to see, he vomits on her.

Jo, Abby and another outcast girl, school newspaper reporter Quinn, start a new clique called the "Anti-Plastics", play a series of pranks on Chastity and Hope. Jo runs against Mandi for Homecoming Queen and their campaign threatens Tyler and Jo's relationship. When Jo tries to give back the money Sidney Hanover had given her for her friendship with Abby, Mandi overhears and uses this against her. This leads to Tyler and the "Anti-Plastics" going against her as she is turning towards Mandi's personality.

Mandi and Nick steal the homecoming court charity money, which is to be donated to an animal shelter. She plants it in Jo's shed, then tips off Principal Duvall stating that the money is there. Thanks to an unwitting betrayal by Quinn, Jo is expelled, but not before she finds Mandi and challenges her to a game of flag football. Mandi refuses until realizing she needs to win to remain popular, so reluctantly agrees.

Tyler and the other Anti-Plastics try to help Jo prove her innocence with the help of the school's tech boy, Elliott. After the Anti-Plastics beat the Plastics at flag football, Mandi and Nick are arrested after Elliott finds images of them planting the money in Jo's home and texts them to all. Principal Duvall apologizes to Jo for the mix-up. At the Homecoming Dance, Abby and Elliott are elected King and Queen (thanks to Jo dropping out of the competition), and Jo and Tyler kiss.

The film ends with Jo and Abby deciding to attend Carnegie Mellon together, while Tyler attends Penn State a short drive from Carnegie Mellon, and Quinn assuming her long coveted position as the leader of the Plastics. 

Although Mandi and Nick both got community service and were allowed to graduate, they lost their popularity for their cruel actions, earning Mandi a bad reputation. Chastity learns the meaning of her name, and Hope begins working on overcoming her fear of germs.

Cast

 Meaghan Martin as Jo Mitchell, a tomboyish 18 year old girl who shares an interest in cars with her father and must move schools at least 3 times a year because of his job.
 Tatum Etheridge as Young Jo
 Jennifer Stone as Abby Hanover, a kind but unpopular girl who comes from a rich background and is a rival of Mandi.
 Anne Alden as Young Abby
 Maiara Walsh as Mandi Weatherly, a cruel, spoiled and popular girl who views Abby as a rival and frequently bullies her and the stepsister of Tyler.
 Anna Cate Donelan as Young Mandi
 Diego Boneta as Tyler Adams, a popular Soccer player who later dates Jo and the stepbrother of Mandi.
 Nicole Gale Anderson as Hope Plotkin, a hypochondriac who has a strong fear of germs and illness and Mandi’s Right-Hand-Woman.
 Claire Holt as Chastity Meyer, a ditzy girl who has multiple boyfriends and a raging libido
 Bethany Anne Lind as Quinn Shinn, a timid wannabe who is on the School Newspaper team.
 Tim Meadows as Principal Ron Duvall, the Principal of Northshore High who has had experience with the Plastics group before.
 Linden Ashby as Rod Mitchell, Jo’s father and a mechanic.
 Donn Lamkin as Sidney Hanover, the wealthy father of Abby and husband of Ilene Hanover.
 Rhoda Griffis as Ilene Hanover, the wealthy mother of Abby and wife of Sidney Hanover.
 Colin Dennard as Elliott Gold, a nerdy boy obsessed with technology who is attracted to Abby.
 Patrick Johnson as Nick "Big Z" Zimmer, Mandi’s boyfriend and a former friend of Tyler.
 Mike Pniewski as Mr. Giamatti, the school Shop teacher.
 Kelly Gilmore as Fifth Year Senior 
 Willie Larson as May
 Juliet Kim as Ling
 Amber Wallace as Violet
 Autumn Dial as Karate Girl
 Katelyn E. Bulluck as Rugby Girl
 Rachel Ellspoof as Cafeteria Girl

Production
Mean Girls 2 was first announced in 2008, as one of the upcoming film sequels lineup by Paramount Famous. In June 2010, Melanie Mayron was hired to direct the film. The film does not reference the events of the original or attempt to connect itself to its predecessor, except for the inclusion of Meadows and the "Plastics" clique as the main antagonist.

Filming
The film was shot in Atlanta, Georgia in July 2010 in 22 days, in which scenes took place at the Sutton Middle School.

Promotion and release
The official trailer of the film was released on November 22, 2010. It premiered on ABC Family as a Mean Girls: Double Feature on January 23, 2011.

Soundtrack

 Track listing

The film's soundtrack has not received an official release.

 "Hot n Cold" by Katy Perry
 "Wake Up Call" by Team JEM (Johnny Andrews, Elizabeth Elkins of The Swear and Michael Wilkes)
 "No Stopping" by Transcenders featuring Josef D'Star
 "Nutmeg" by Transcenders
 "Favorite Distraction" by SuperSpy
 "Days Like This" by Transcenders featuring Aimee Allen
 "Addicted" by Toby Lightman
 "Love, Love, Love" by Hope featuring Jason Mraz
 "Middle Ground" by Transcenders
 "So Big" by Iyaz
 "Middle Ground" by Transcenders featuring Tracey Amos
 "Better Than Her" by Matisse
 "Obsession" by Sky Ferreira
 "Walk of Shame" by The Like
 "Clavy" by Transcenders
 "Ground Level" by Transcenders
 "Party Plane" by Transcenders
 "The Chase" by Transcenders
 "2012 (It Ain't the End)" by Jay Sean featuring Nicki Minaj
 "Mon Cheri" by A.B. O'Neill
 "Crazy Good" by Juliana Joya
 "I Know" by Kimberly Cole

Reception
Mean Girls 2 received negative reviews from critics, with Hilary Busis of Entertainment Weekly calling it a "thinly veiled, low-budget remake of the 2004 hit with which it shares a name".

Brian Orndorf gave the film a D+ grade and wrote that "Whatever problems I had with the 2004 feature aren't even an issue here, as the new film offers a decidedly more pedestrian take on the clique warfare concept, trading Fey's sly ambition for cruel DTV routine."

Sandie Angulo Chen of Common Sense Media, by contrast, gave the film 3/5 and wrote: "Mildly amusing sequel follows same 'be yourself' storyline."

Ratings
The film was the most-watched television movie of the week among viewers ages 12–34, with 2 million viewers in that age group (3.4 million overall); it attracted a strong female audience (1.6 million).

References

External links

 
 
 

Mean Girls (franchise)
2011 television films
2011 films
2011 comedy films
2010s American films
2010s English-language films
2010s high school films
2010s teen comedy films
ABC Family original films
American comedy television films
American high school films
American sequel films
American teen comedy films
Direct-to-video sequel films
Films about school bullying
Films about teenagers
Films directed by Melanie Mayron
Films set in Illinois
Films shot in Atlanta
Paramount Pictures direct-to-video films
Television sequel films